A drug with psychotomimetic (also known as psychotogenic) actions mimics the symptoms of psychosis, including delusions and/or delirium, as opposed to only hallucinations. Psychotomimesis is the onset of psychotic symptoms following the administration of such a drug.

Some rarely used drugs of the opioid class have psychotomimetic effects. Particularly, mixed kappa receptor agonist mu receptor antagonist opioid analgesics can cause dose-related psychotomimesis.  This adverse effect, incidence 1–2%, limits their use. Pentazocine and butorphanol fall under this opioid class.

There is evidence that cannabinoids are psychotomimetic, especially delta-9-tetrahydrocannabinol (Δ9-THC). D'Souza et al. (2004) found that intravenous THC produced effects that resemble schizophrenia in both the positive symptoms (hallucinations, delusions, paranoia, and disorganized thinking) and negative symptoms (avolition, asociality, apathy, alogia, and anhedonia). Certain strains of cannabis may be more psychotomimetic than others, probably due to the action of cannabidiol (CBD), which inhibits P450 3A11's metabolic conversion of THC to 11-Hydroxy-THC, which is four times more psychoactive.p. 39

Carl Sagan used the word "psychotomimetic" in his anonymous article "Mr.X" to describe the effects of cannabis, writing that "I smile, or sometimes even laugh out loud at the pictures on the insides of my eyelids. In this sense, I suppose cannabis is psychotomimetic, but I find none of the panic or terror that accompanies some psychoses."

Psychostimulants, such as cocaine, amphetamines, and synthetic cathinones (including bath salts) are known to produce psychotic symptoms similar to paranoid schizophrenia and manic-depressive psychosis.

Dissociative drugs (NMDA receptor antagonists) such as PCP also elicit psychotic behavior in its users which may result in medical intervention.

Deliriant drugs (muscarinic acetylcholine receptor antagonists) such as BZ (QNB) also fall into the class of psychotomimetics.

List of psychotomimetic drugs

Substances that can induce psychotomimetic effects include:
 Alcohol (chronic/excessive use)
Amantadine
Amphetamine
Amylone
Atropine
Benztropine
Benzydamine
Benzylpiperazine
Bromocriptine
Bupropion
Cathinone
Cocaine
Cyclazocine
Desoxypipradrol
Dimethyltryptamine (DMT)
Diphenhydramine (DPH)
Doxylamine
Efavirenz
Enadoline
Ephedrine
Ergine
Ethylone
Ibogaine
Inhalants
Ketamine
Ketazocine
Levorphanol
Lysergic acid diethylamide (LSD)
Meperidine
Mephedrone
Mescaline
Methamphetamine
Methcathinone
Methorphan
Methoxetamine (MXE)
Methylenedioxyamphetamine (MDA)
Methylenedioxymethamphetamine (MDMA)
Methylenedioxy-N-ethylamphetamine (MDEA)
Methylenedioxypyrovalerone (MDPV)
Methylone
Methylphenidate
Montelukast
Myristicin
N-Ethylpentylone
Pentazocine
Phencyclidine (PCP)
Phentermine
Pramipexole
Prolintane
Prolintanone
Propylhexedrine
Psilocybin
Pyrovalerone
Quinuclidinyl benzilate (QNB)
Rotigotine
Salvinorin A
Scopolamine
Synthetic cannabinoids
Tetrahydrocannabinol (THC)
Tramadol
Trihexyphenidyl
Zolpidem
Zopiclone

See also
 Amphetamines
Anticholinergics
Antidepressants
Antihistamines
Antipsychotics
Anxiogenics
Anxiolytics
Cannabinoids
Cathinones
Deliriants
Depressants
Depressogens
Designer drugs
Dissociatives
 Hallucinogens
Hypnotics
Narcotics
Opioids
Phenidates
Psychedelics
Sedatives
 Stimulants

References

Drug classes defined by psychological effects
Psychosis